Seyed Khalil Alinezhad (alternative spelling: Seyyed Khalil Alinejad; Kurdish: سەید خەلیل عالینژاد, born 1958, Sahneh, Kermanshah Province, Iran –  2001, Gothenburg, Sweden) was a great master of the spiritual instrument tanbur, recognized as one of the best tanbur players ever known.

Biography
Seyed Khalil was born in a Kurdish family in a Sahneh County village in the Kermanshah Province, in western Iran. He started his tanbur lessons with Seyed Nader Taheri and followed his studies under supervisions of Seyed Amrollah Shah Ebrahimi, Dervish Amir Hayati, and Master Abedin Khademi. He finished his academic studies in the 1970s from University of Tehran with a thesis titled "Tanbur – from the very beginning till now" (تنبور از دیر باز تا کنون).

During his lifetime he became known as a spiritual leader of the mystic religion Ahl-e Haqq (People of truth), a religious tradition related to Sufism, Shia Islam, and Alevi traditions.

He is considered by many the very greatest tanbur player of the 20th century. At the beginning of 80s he joined the Shams Ensemble. In the mid-1980s he established a musical group named “Baba Taher Ensemble (بابا طاهر ). During his life, besides performing his composed solo masterpieces he also had many cooperative performances. He still has many supporters, those who enjoy his spiritual and holy songs, and those who enjoy his masterpieces.

At the end of 80s he left his hometown for Tehran and from Tehran to Sweden. In 2001, he was murdered and then burnt in fire in Gothenburg, Sweden. The reasons of his murder were not completely investigated, Some Iranians believe he was killed by his Ahle Haq rivals, but the more popular belief is that he was killed by islamic republic government agents; neither position has been proven. His body was buried in Sahneh County.

Albums
 Sheyda (شیدا)
 Shokraneh - In collboartion: Hamidreza Khojandi (شکرانه - با همکاری: حمیدرضا خجندی)
https://music.apple.com/gb/album/shokraneh/677459850
 Aein-e-Mastan(ایین-مستان)
 Navay-e-Ghalandari(نوای قلندری)
 Hemasi(حماسی)
 Zemzemeh Ghalandari(زمزمه قلندری)
 Sanay-e-Ali(ثنای علی)
 Hal-e-Khonin Delan(حال خونین دلان )
 Bigharar(بیقرار)
 SamaA-e-Sar-Mastan(سماع سر مستان)
 Ghoghnoos(ققنوس )
 Taknavazi(تکنوازی)
 Javab-e-Avaz(جواب آواز)

See also
Mala Pareshan

References

External links
 Aftab.ir
 Iran's History and Art

1958 births
2001 deaths
People from Sahneh
Iranian Kurdish people
Iranian Yarsanis
Tanbur players